The cerebral aqueduct (aqueductus mesencephali, mesencephalic duct, sylvian aqueduct or aqueduct of Sylvius) is a conduit for cerebrospinal fluid (CSF) that connects the third ventricle to the fourth ventricle of the ventricular system of the brain. It is located in the midbrain dorsal to the pons and ventral to the cerebellum. The cerebral aqueduct is surrounded by an enclosing area of gray matter called the periaqueductal gray, or central gray. It was first named after Franciscus Sylvius.

Structure

Development 
The cerebral aqueduct, as other parts of the ventricular system of the brain, develops from the central canal of the neural tube, and it originates from the portion of the neural tube that is present in the developing mesencephalon, hence the name "mesencephalic duct."

Function 

The cerebral aqueduct acts like a canal that passes through the midbrain. It connects the third ventricle with the fourth ventricle so that cerebrospinal fluid (CSF) moves between the cerebral ventricles and the canal connecting these ventricles.

Clinical significance 
Aqueductal stenosis, a narrowing of the cerebral aqueduct, obstructs the flow of CSF and has been associated with non-communicating hydrocephalus. Such narrowing can be congenital, arise via tumor compression (e.g. pinealoblastoma), or through cyclical gliosis secondary to an initial partial obstruction.

History 
The cerebral aqueduct was first named after Franciscus Sylvius.

Additional images

See also 
 List of regions in the human brain

References

External links 

 

Ventricular system